Sheikh Ali, Sheykh Ali, or Shaykh Ali may refer to:

People
 Sheikh Ali Jaber, an Indonesian preacher and scholar
 Faiq Al Sheikh Ali, an Iraqi lawyer and politician
 Ali Al-Thani, a Qatari equestrian
 Sheikh Ali Madad, a Pakistani Shia Muslim religious leader and politician
 Sheikh Rajab Ali, a Pakistani Shia Muslim religious leader and politician
 Ali Dhere, a Somali cleric and religious fundamentalist
 Ali bin Abdullah Al Thani, the emir of Qatar between 1949 and 1960
 Sheikh Ali Jimale, a Somali politician
 Sheikh Ali Ilyas, a religious leader among the Yazidis
 Ali Salman, a Bahraini cleric
 Shaykh Ali Khan Zanganeh, an Iranian politician of Kurdish origin
 Ahmed Sheikh Ali, a Somali lawyer, author, and judge
 Shaykh Ali Khan, Khan of Quba and Derbent

Places

Iran
 Sheykh Ali Tuseh, a village in Iran's Gilan province
 Sheykh Ali Bast, a village in Iran's Gilan province
 Sheykh Ali Mahalleh, Mazandaran, a village in Iran's Mazandaran province
 Shahrak-e Kalateh-ye Sheikh Ali, a village in Iran's South Khorasan province
 Sheykh Ali, Ardabil, a village in Iran's Ardabil province
 Sheykh Ali, Chaharmahal and Bakhtiari, a village in Iran's Chaharmahal and Bakhtiari province
 Sheykh Ali, Bastak, a village in Iran's Hormozgan province
 Sheykh Ali, Hajjiabad, a village in Iran's Hormozgan province
 Sheykh Ali, Khuzestan, a village in Iran's Khuzestan province
 Sarab-e Sheykh Ali, a village in Iran's Lorestan province
 Sheykhaleh, a village in Iran's Kurdistan province
 Sheykh Ali, West Azerbaijan, a village in Iran's West Azerbaijan province

Elsewhere
 Shaykh Ali, a village in Syria's Hama governorate
 Sheikh Ali District, in Afghanistan's Parwan province

Other uses
 Sheikh Ali (Hazara tribe), a major tribe of Hazaras

See also
 Skheykhali (disambiguation)